The 2017–18 Oregon State Beavers women's basketball team represents Oregon State University during the 2017–18 NCAA Division I women's basketball season. The Beavers, led by eighth year head coach Scott Rueck, play their games at the Gill Coliseum and were members of the Pac-12 Conference. They finished the season 26–8, 14–4 in Pac-12 play to finish in a tie for third place. They lost in the quarterfinals of the Pac-12 women's tournament to Arizona State. They received an at-large bid of the NCAA women's tournament where they defeated Western Kentucky and upset Tennessee in the first and second rounds, Baylor in the sweet sixteen before getting blown out by Louisville in the elite eight.

Previous season
They finished the season 31–5, 16–2 in Pac-12 play to win Pac-12 regular season title. They advanced to the championship game Pac-12 women's tournament where they lost to Stanford. They received an at-large bid of the NCAA women's tournament where they defeated Long Beach State and Creighton in the first and second rounds before losing to Florida State in the sweet sixteen.

Roster

Schedule

|-
!colspan=9 style=| Exhibition

|-
!colspan=9 style=| Non-conference regular season

|-
!colspan=9 style=| Pac-12 regular season

|-
!colspan=9 style=|Pac-12 Women's Tournament

|-
!colspan=9 style=|NCAA Women's Tournament

Rankings
2017–18 NCAA Division I women's basketball rankings

See also
2017–18 Oregon State Beavers men's basketball team

References

Oregon State Beavers women's basketball seasons
Oregon State
2018 in sports in Oregon
2017 in sports in Oregon
Oregon State